Stéphane Collet (born 13 June 1972) is a Malagasy former professional footballer who played as a midfielder.

Collet was born in Antsiranana, Madagascar. He debuted professionally for OGC Nice, and spent his career in Ligue 1 and La Liga. He has represented the Malagasy national team. While at Strasbourg he won the Coupe de la Ligue in 1997, playing in the final.

References

External links
 
 

1972 births
Living people
Association football midfielders
Malagasy footballers
OGC Nice players
RC Strasbourg Alsace players
RC Lens players
Real Sociedad footballers
Rapid de Menton players
Ligue 1 players
La Liga players
Madagascar international footballers
Malagasy expatriate footballers
Malagasy expatriate sportspeople in France
Malagasy expatriate sportspeople in Spain
Expatriate footballers in France
Expatriate footballers in Spain